

Portugal
 Angola – António de Lencastre, Governor of Angola (1772–1779)
 Macau –
 Diogo Fernandes Salema e Saldanha, Governor of Macau (1771–1777)
 D. Alexdra da Silva Pedrosa Guimares, Governor of Macau (1777–1778)

Spain
 Río de la Plata – Pedro Antonio de Cevallos, Viceroy of Río de la Plata (1777–1778)

Colonial governors
Colonial governors
1777